"Out for the Cash" is a single and posse cut from DJ Honda's eponymous 1996 album. It was released by Relativity Records as a 12 inch in the United States and by Sony Music Entertainment as a CD single in Japan. The song features raps by the three original Beatnuts, as well as Fat Joe and Problemz. The song's lyrics are braggadocios and discuss the pursuit of attaining money. The song's beat, produced by turntablist DJ Honda, is reliant on pounding drums and a mournful soul sample. DJ Honda scratches a vocal sample from his song "Straight Talk from NY" onto "Out for the Cash". "Out for the Cash" is different from the DJ Honda song "Out for the Cash (5 Deadly Venoms)," also known as "Pre of Cash."

"Out for the Cash" failed to chart, but nonetheless was turned into a music video by director Nick Quested. The song is featured on two hip hop compilation albums: 1996's Relativity Urban Assault and 1998's Crucial Rap.

Track listings

US 12" vinyl

A-Side
 "Out for the Cash (Clean Version)" (3:37)
 "Out for the Cash (Street Version)" (3:37)
 "Out for the Cash (Instrumental)" (4:22)

B-Side
 "Kill the Noize (Clean Version)" (4:03)
 "Kill the Noize (Street Version)" (4:03)
 "5 Deadly Venoms" (3:54)

Japan CD
 "Out for the Cash #2" (5:44)
 "Out for the Cash #1" (5:50)
 "Out for the Cash #3" (5:30)
 "Out for the Cash #4" (5 Deadly Venoms) (5:44)

1995 songs
1996 singles
The Beatnuts songs
Songs written by Fat Joe
Relativity Records singles